The Belgium men's national under-18 basketball team is a national basketball team of Belgium, administered by the Basketball Belgium. It represents the country in men's international under-18 basketball competitions.

FIBA U18 European Championship participations

See also
Belgium men's national basketball team
Belgium men's national under-16 basketball team
Belgium women's national under-19 basketball team

References

External links
Official website
Archived records of Belgium team participations

Basketball in Belgium
Basketball
Men's national under-18 basketball teams